Carcharodontosaurus is a genus of large carcharodontosaurid theropod dinosaur that existed during the Cenomanian age of the Late Cretaceous in Northern Africa. It is currently known to have two species: C. saharicus and C. iguidensis.

History of discovery

In 1924, two teeth were found in the Continental intercalaire of Algeria, showing what were at the time unique characteristics. These teeth were described by Depéret and Savornin (1925) as representing a new taxon, which they named Megalosaurus saharicus and later categorized in the subgenus Dryptosaurus. Some years later, paleontologist Ernst Stromer described the remains of a partial skull and skeleton from Cenomanian aged rocks in the Bahariya Formation of Egypt (Stromer, 1931); originally excavated in 1914, the remains consisted of a partial skull, teeth, vertebrae, claw bones and assorted hip and leg bones. The teeth in this new finding matched the characteristics of those described by Depéret and Savornin, which led to Stromer conserving the species name saharicus but finding it necessary to erect a new genus for this species, Carcharodontosaurus, for their similarities, in sharpness and serrations, to the teeth of Carcharodon (Great white shark).

The fossils described by Stromer were destroyed in 1944 during World War II, but a new, more complete skull was found in the Kem Kem Group of Morocco during an expedition led by paleontologist Paul Sereno in 1995, near the Algerian border and the locality where the teeth described by Depéret and Savornin (1925) were found. The teeth found with this new skull matched those described by Depéret and Savornin (1925) and Stromer (1931); the rest of the skull also matched that described by Stromer. This new skull was designated as the neotype by Brusatte and Sereno (2007) who also described a second species of Carcharodontosaurus, C. iguidensis from the Echkar Formation of Niger, differing from C. saharicus in aspects of the maxilla and braincase.

The taxonomy of Carcharodontosaurus was discussed in Chiarenza and Cau (2016), who suggested that the neotype of C. saharicus was similar but distinct from the holotype in the morphology of the maxillary interdental plates. However, palaeontologist Mickey Mortimer put forward that the suggested difference between the C. saharicus neotype and holotype was actually due to damage to the neotype. The authors also identified the referred material of C. iguidensis as belonging to Sigilmassasaurus (later referred to Spinosaurus sp.) and a non-carcharodontosaurine, and therefore chose to limit C. iguidensis to the holotype pending future research.

Description

Brain and inner ear

In 2001, Hans C. E. Larsson published a description of the inner ear and endocranium of Carcharodontosaurus saharicus. Starting from the portion of the brain closest to the tip of the animal's snout is the forebrain, which is followed by the midbrain. The midbrain is angled downwards at a 45-degree angle and towards the rear of the animal. This is followed by the hindbrain, which is roughly parallel to the forebrain and forms a roughly 40-degree angle with the midbrain. Overall, the brain of C. saharicus would have been similar to that of a related dinosaur, Allosaurus fragilis. Larsson found that the ratio of the cerebrum to the volume of the brain overall in Carcharodontosaurus was typical for a non-avian reptile. Carcharodontosaurus also had a large optic nerve.

The three semicircular canals of the inner ear of Carcharodontosaurus saharicus – when viewed from the side – had a subtriangular outline. This subtriangular inner ear configuration is present in Allosaurus, lizards, turtles, but not in birds. The semi-"circular" canals themselves were actually very linear, which explains the pointed silhouette. In life, the floccular lobe of the brain would have projected into the area surrounded by the semicircular canals, just like in other non-avian theropods, birds, and pterosaurs.

Classification

The following cladogram after Apesteguía et al., 2016, shows the placement of Carcharodontosaurus within Carcharodontosauridae.

Paleobiology

Feeding

Pathology

SGM-Din 1, a Carcharodontosaurus saharicus skull, has a circular puncture wound in the nasal and "an abnormal projection of bone on the antorbital rim."

References

External links

 Student Identifies Enormous New Dinosaur December 7 2007 from the Science daily
 Discovery Channel Videos: Monsters Resurrected: Biggest Killer Dino

Carcharodontosaurids
Late Cretaceous dinosaurs of Africa
Cenomanian genus extinctions
Bahariya Formation
Fossil taxa described in 1931
Taxa named by Ernst Stromer
Apex predators
Cenomanian life